How Long 'til Black Future Month? is a collection of science fiction and fantasy short stories by American novelist N. K. Jemisin. The book was published in November 2018 by Orbit Books, an imprint of the Hachette Book Group. The name of the collection comes from an Afrofuturism essay (not included in the book) that Jemisin wrote in 2013. Four of the 22 stories included in the book had not been previously published; the others, written between 2004 and 2017, had been originally published in speculative fiction magazines and other short story collections. The settings for three of the stories were developed into full-length novels after their original publication: The Killing Moon, The Fifth Season, and The City We Became.

Background 
At the time of publication in 2018, the 46-year-old author, N. K. Jemisin, had just won that year's Hugo, Nebula and Locus awards for her latest novel The Stone Sky, the third novel in her Broken Earth series. While Jemisin had become better known as a novelist since her 2010 debut novel The Hundred Thousand Kingdoms, she had short stories published since 2004 and had "Non-Zero Probabilities" nominated for the 2010 Hugo Award and Nebula Award for Best Short Story. Since then, she worked on short stories only between her work on novels.

Being active in the American science fiction and fantasy writing community and having experienced the industry as an African American fan and aspiring writer, Jemisin advocated more representation for minorities in literature and being critical of portraying harmful stereotypes. She stated that she believed the publishing industry was stagnating by producing predominately self-reassuring "comfort fiction" for its core audience. To this end, she wrote an essay in 2013 titled "How Long 'Til Black Future Month? The Toxins of Speculative Fiction, and the Antidote that is Janelle Monáe" and edited the 2018 edition of the short-story anthology series The Best American Science Fiction and Fantasy, purposefully selecting stories that she found revolutionary, innovative, or provided alternative perspectives. While the essay was not included in the book How Long 'Til Black Future Month?, many of its points were included in the book's introduction section. In line with the essay, and as Jemisin explained in the book's introduction, the short story format allowed her to write many of the protagonists as persons of color which she otherwise finds makes full-length novels less likely to be published or read.

Style and themes 
With the title itself invoking afrofuturism, the stories include a range of sub-genres of speculative fiction. For example, representative stories and sub-genres include "The Effluent Engine" as an alternate history steampunk story set in 19th century New Orleans, "Cloud Dragon Skies" as climate fiction, "Too Many Yesterdays, Not Enough Tomorrows" as a time travel story, "The Storyteller's Replacement" sword and sorcery, "On the Banks of the River Lex" post-apocalyptic fiction, and "The Trojan Girl" cyberpunk. Referencing older fiction, Jemisin includes a pastiche of Ursula K. Le Guin's "The Ones Who Walk Away from Omelas" with "The Ones Who Stay and Fight" and an alternative take on Robert A. Heinlein's The Puppet Masters with "Walking Awake". Three of the short stories, described by Jemisin as "proof-of-concept" stories, would later be used as a basis for future novels: "The Narcomancer" for The Killing Moon, "Stone Hunger" for The Fifth Season, and "The City Born Great" for The City We Became. Based on these approaches, science fiction editor Gary K. Wolfe describes Jemisin as "someone who enjoys playing with the possibilities of the plotted tale".

While the stories in the collection cover a range of topics and themes, reviewers noted many of the stories portray protagonists that are not members of the story's dominant society and are written to display compassion. Many of the stories illustrate the power dynamics of those societies and see characters seeking an escape or otherwise asserting themselves. As the reviewer in the Los Angeles Times states, "As in most of the stories here, the protagonist of "Stone Hunger" refuses to accept the sectarian role dictated by those who rule, or seem to rule, the broken world she inhabits."

Synopsis and format 
The book is a collection of 22 short stories with an introductory section all written by Jemisin. All but four of the stories were previously published between 2004 and 2017. The stories are:

Publication and reception 
The book was published by Orbit Books, a speculative fiction imprint of the Hachette Book Group. It was released as a hardcover on November 28, 2018, and then as a paperback a year later. An audio book version, narrated by Shayna Small, was published by the Hachette Audio imprint. The book was nominated for the 2019 World Fantasy Award—Collection award and recognized with an Alex Award from the American Library Association.

Both Booklist and Library Journal noted the book was suitable for general science fiction and fantasy fans, in addition to admirers of Jemisin's novels. The reviewer for the Los Angeles Times wrote that "some of Jemisin's strongest stories [such as Red Dirt Witch] deal explicitly with the horrors of racism in a world that is recognizably our own." In her review for NPR, speculative fiction writer Amal El-Mohtar found that "Jemisin's strengths lie at the intersection of character and setting ... [and] I especially loved how beautifully and effectively Jemisin writes food and cooking", citing "The Narcomancer", "Stone Hunger" and "Cuisine des Mémoires" as among the best, with "Those Who Stay and Fight" and "The Brides of Heaven" as leaving her dissatisfied. Writing for Locus magazine, Gary K. Wolfe states "Jemisin's fiction can be angry or funny or dreamlike or bitter, sometimes all at the same time, but it keeps bringing us back to that observation of a character from "Walking Awake": all the monsters we really need are right here already."

Awards

References 

2018 short story collections
Afrofuturism
Science fiction short story collections
Speculative fiction short stories
Works by N. K. Jemisin
Orbit Books books
African-American short story collections